Vasilios Katsoulidis (born 10 April 2002) is a Greek professional footballer who plays as a right-back for Super League 2 club Olympiacos B.

References

2002 births
Living people
Super League Greece 2 players
Gamma Ethniki players
Kozani F.C. players
Olympiacos F.C. B players
Association football defenders
Greek footballers
Sportspeople from Orestiada